Kemerburgaz is an underground station on the M11 line of the Istanbul Metro in Eyüp. It is located below Selanik Boulevard on the west side of the town of Kemerburgaz. The station is among the first five metro stations to be located outside of the city (urban area) of Istanbul.

Construction of the station began in 2016, along with the entire route from Gayrettepe to the Istanbul Airport. Kemerburgaz station was opened on 22 January 2023

Layout

References

Istanbul metro stations
Rapid transit stations under construction in Turkey